Promise Me the Moon is an album by The David Sanborn Band, released in December 1977 through Warner Bros. Records and reissued by Wounded Bird Records many years later. The album reached number 27 on Billboard's Jazz Albums chart.

Track listing
"Promise Me the Moon" (Danny Kortchmar) - 3:58
"Benjamin" (James Taylor) - 1:29
"Stranger's Arms" (Kortchmar) - 4:20
"Heart Lake" (Mark Egan) - 5:19
"The Rev" (Hiram Bullock) - 3:54
"We Fool Ourselves" (Bullock) - 5:12
"Morning Salsa" (Herb Bushler, Rosalinda De Leon) - 6:05
"The Legend of Cheops" (Victor Lewis) - 6:34

Personnel 
 David Sanborn – alto saxophone, sopranino saxophone, lyricon, vocals (3)
 Rosalinda de Leon – keyboards
 Dale Oehler – electric piano (2)
 Hiram Bullock – guitars, vocals (1, 6)
 Mark Egan – electric bass
 Victor Lewis – drums
 Jumma Santos – percussion
 Christine Faith – additional vocals
 Lani Groves – additional vocals
 Kat McCord – additional vocals
 Hamish Stuart – additional vocals

Production 
 Theresa Del Pozzo – executive producer 
 Dale Oehler – producer
 Alex Sadkin – engineer
 Jack Nuber – assistant engineer
 Hank Cicalo – mixing (2, 3, 4)
 Milt Cailce – mix assistant (2, 3, 4)
 Steve Katz – mix assistant (2, 3, 4)
 Bernie Grundman – mastering 
 Ritch Barnes – artwork, photography
 Stephen Pettigrew – artwork, photography
 Loy – artwork, photography
 Patsy Norvell – typography

References

1977 albums
David Sanborn albums
Warner Records albums